In mathematics, ω-logic can refer to:
 ω-logic, an infinitary extension of first-order logic
 Ω-logic, a deductive system in set theory developed by Hugh Woodin